Allium meronense is a plant species found in Israel and Lebanon. Bulbs are egg-shaped, up to 30 mm long. Scape is flexuous or ascendant, up to 25 cm long. Leaves are narrowly lanceolate, up to 30 cm long. Tepals are white with faint green midveins; anthers yellow; ovary deep purple.

References

meronense
Onions
Flora of Israel
Flora of Lebanon
Flora of Palestine (region)
Plants described in 2011